James Marwood (born 21 May 1990) is an English professional footballer who plays as a forward.

Club career
Son of former Arsenal player Brian Marwood, James Marwood began his career as a youth team player with Newcastle United, before playing for English non-league sides Blyth Spartans and Team Northumbria. After joining Gateshead in 2010, he went on to make over 100 appearances for the club.

Having been utilised as a winger, Marwood moved to a striking position in season 2013–14, resulting in him being the club's top goalscorer.

St Mirren
On 26 June 2014, Marwood signed a one-year contract with St Mirren, with the option of a further year. He made his competitive debut for the club against Motherwell on 9 August 2014, in the Scottish Premiership. On 20 January 2015, he left St Mirren, with his contract being cancelled by mutual consent.

Forest Green Rovers
On 23 January 2015, it was announced that Marwood had signed for Conference Premier side Forest Green Rovers on an 18-month contract. He made his debut for the club on 31 January 2015 as a substitute in a 1–0 home win over Nuneaton Town. He scored his first goal for the club on 10 February 2015 in a 2–2 away draw against Alfreton Town. At the end of the 2014–15 season he helped Forest Green to the play-offs, only to be denied a second consecutive year of appearing in the final because of a semi-final defeat against Bristol Rovers.

Gateshead
On 24 June 2015, it was announced that Marwood had left Forest Green and re-signed for Gateshead. After missing the majority of the season with an ankle injury, Marwood was released at the end of the 2015–16 season.

International career
Marwood earned a call up to the England C team in May 2014, alongside Gateshead teammate Marcus Maddison. He made his unofficial debut in a 2–2 draw with Sparta Prague B on 21 May 2014, before making his official debut three days later as a late substitute in a 1–0 defeat to Slovakia U23. He made his first international start on 28 May 2014 in a 4–2 defeat against Hungary U23.

References

External links

1990 births
Living people
Sportspeople from St Albans
English footballers
England semi-pro international footballers
Association football forwards
Newcastle United F.C. players
Blyth Spartans A.F.C. players
Team Northumbria F.C. players
Gateshead F.C. players
FC Halifax Town players
St Mirren F.C. players
Forest Green Rovers F.C. players
Northern Football League players
National League (English football) players
Scottish Professional Football League players